Greenwood High School can refer to several educational institutions in the World.
Greenwood High School (Arkansas) in Greenwood, Arkansas
Greenwood High School (Indiana) in Greenwood, Indiana
Greenwood High School (Kentucky) in Bowling Green, Kentucky
Greenwood High School (Mississippi) in Greenwood, Mississippi
Ashland-Greenwood High School in Ashland, Nebraska
Greenwood High School (Pennsylvania) in Millerstown, Pennsylvania
Greenwood High School (South Carolina) in Greenwood, South Carolina
Greenwood High School (Texas) in Midland, Texas
Greenwood High School (Wisconsin) in Greenwood, Wisconsin
Greenwood High School, (Warangal)

See also
 Greenwood (disambiguation)
 Greenwood Academy (disambiguation)